The Pan-American Highway route in North America is the portion of a network of roads nearly  in length that travels through the mainland nations of the Americas. No definitive length of the Pan American Highway exists because the Canadian government has never officially defined any specific route as being part of the Pan-American Highway, while in the United States, the Federal Highway Administration (FHWA) has designated the entire Interstate Highway System part of the Pan-American Highway System, although this has not yet been reinforced by any official highway signage. Mexico officially has many branches connecting to various interstate highways at the U.S. border.

United States (Alaska) 

The Pan-American Highway unofficially begins in Prudhoe Bay, Alaska near Deadhorse. Traveling south to Fairbanks, Alaska, the Highway follows the length of the Dalton Highway (Alaska Route 11) and Alaska Route 2. (Dalton Highway was the subject of the BBC's first episode of World's Most Dangerous Roads.) From Fairbanks, Alaska's third largest city, the Pan-American Highway and the Alaska Highway are one and the same, following Alaska Route 2 southeast to the Canada–United States border southeast of Northway, Alaska, and adjacent to the Tetlin National Wildlife Refuge.

Note: The Pan-American Highway reenters the U.S., potentially in several locations along the U.S.-Canada border.

Canada

Yukon 
Crossing the border into Canada, Alaska Highway 2 turns into Yukon Highway 1. The first significant settlement along the way is Beaver Creek, Yukon. At Haines Junction, where it meets Yukon Highway 3, Yukon Highway 1 turns east toward Whitehorse, the capital of the Yukon Territory.

Through most of Whitehorse, Yukon Highway 2 and Yukon Highway 1 share an alignment. Yukon Highway 1 cuts southeast toward Marsh Lake, Yukon while Yukon Highway 2 cuts south to Skagway, Alaska. Eventually, Yukon Highway 1 intersects with Yukon Highway 8 and Yukon Highway 7 at Jake's Corner, Yukon; the Pan-American Highway continues on Yukon 1 east-northeast from this junction.

At Johnson's Crossing, Yukon Highway 1 meets Yukon Highway 6 and travels southeast through Teslin, Yukon. The Pan-American Highway continues on Yukon 1 as it crosses over into British Columbia (B. C.). After several miles, the Highway reenters the Yukon (once again as Highway 1) and continues southeast of Watson Lake until it, once again, enters British Columbia as B.C. Highway 97.

British Columbia 
After travelling about  past the British Columbia–Yukon border, the Pan-American Highway reaches the first settlement in British Columbia at Lower Post. The Highway then re-enters British Columbia (as BC 97) for the final time. The Pan-American Highway continues south to southeast through a long uninhabited stretch until it passes through the villages of Fireside and Coal River, then runs east parallel to the Liard River.

The Pan-American Highway continues on B.C. Highway 97 as it passes through Toad River Post, and then Summit Lake, which is nested between Stone Mountain and Mount Saint George. Further down the road, B.C. Highway 97 intersects with B.C. Highway 77; the Pan-American Highway continues along B.C. 97 east to Fort Nelson.

From Fort Nelson, the Highway travels south for about  until it reaches Fort St. John. It continues on B.C. Highway 97 southeast for another  to reach the end of the Alaska Highway at Dawson Creek.

Canada's length of the Pan-American Highway is neither official nor defined beyond the end of the Alaska Highway.

Alberta
After B.C Highway 97, the unofficial route becomes Alberta Highway 43. At Clairmont, Highway 43, turns to Alberta Highway 2, Highway 43 goes left. Highway 43 goes for  before reaching Edmonton. The unofficial route turns 2 ways, one way goes to Lloydminster, Minneapolis, and Dallas and merges with the second way. The second way goes to Calgary and the US border.

United States (Contiguous)
Note: The Pan-American Highway is almost never referred to by name in the U.S. because of its correlation with the Interstate Highway System rather than any singular route.

The true original route of the Pan-American Highway follows Mexican Federal Highway 1 or Mexican Federal Highway 2 from Mexico City north to Tijuana, Baja California.  Both Mexican Federal Highway routes reunite/merge in Tijuana Centro as the Pan-American Highway continues north to the United States Port of Entry at San Ysidro, California.

The Pan-American Highway enters the United States as Interstate 5 crossing the border in San Diego, California at the busiest land port of entry in the world.   From here, Interstate 5 and Interstate 15 both extend north along separate routes to the United States border with Canada.  

In 1932, a bill introduced in the U.S. Congress proposed, among other roads, a route from Duluth, Minnesota, to Laredo, Texas, to connect with the Pan-American Highway in Mexico; this route probably followed today's Interstate 35. When the section of Interstate 35 in San Antonio, Texas was built, it was named the Pan Am Expressway, as it lies along this route. Nonetheless, this route was never singularly named the Pan-American Highway.

Interstate 25 in Albuquerque, New Mexico, is named the Pan-American Freeway and it, along with part of Interstate 10 and U.S. Route 85, is officially part of the CanAm Highway.

U.S. Route 81 is claimed to be part of the Pan American Highway from Wichita, Kansas, to Watertown, South Dakota, where it runs separately from Interstate 29.

Interstate 69 from the Canada–United States border in Michigan to the Mexico–United States border in south Texas has been referred to as the NAFTA Superhighway, which, when completed, will link to an official branch of the Pan-American Highway after crossing the border  Laredo, Texas, and Nuevo Laredo, Tamaulipas.

Mexico 
The Pan-American Highway in Mexico officially begins at the border crossing between San Diego, California and Tijuana, Baja California.  Interstate 5 in the United States connects to Mexican Federal Highway 1 at the busiest international border crossing in the world.  The Pan-American Highway continues south to Mexico City along two separate routes;  historic Mexican Federal Highway 1 and toll Mexican Federal Highway 1D via Baja California Peninsula or Mexican Federal Highway 2 via the mainland.

The Pan-American Highway (as Mexico Highway 85D) enters Mexico City, but downtown Mexico City can be bypassed using Mexico Highway 136 (a divided limited-access route) and Mexico Highway 115, which reconnects to Mexico Highway 95D south of the Mexican Federal District.

The route then reverts to an undivided highway and enters the state of Oaxaca.

The Pan-American Highway is now in southern Mexico, which is a combination of small mountains, hills, and jungles. It is another  to the border with the state of Chiapas where the Highway crosses the Continental Divide. The Highway then crosses the Mexico-Guatemala border at Ciudad Cuauhtémoc.

Guatemala 

The Pan-American Highway crosses the Continental Divide again, and into the Sierra de los Cuchumatanes mountains.

The highway continues as CA Highway 1 and approaches the border with El Salvador.

El Salvador 

El Salvador is the smallest country (by area) along the route of the Pan-American Highway. After crossing into El Salvador at Candelaria de la Frontera, the Inter-American Highway continues on toward Santa Ana as Central America Highway 1.

From Santa Ana it's about  San Salvador, El Salvador's capital and largest city. At Nueva San Salvador, the highway passes near the Volcano de San Salvador.

Honduras 

Just past Nacaome is a highway traveling north to Tegucigalpa, the capital of Honduras.

Nicaragua 

Around this area the Highway is in view of Lake Nicaragua, which is the largest lake in Central America.

Costa Rica 

After entering Costa Rica, the Highway separates two national parks, the Santa Rosa National Park to the west and Guanacaste National Park to the east. In the region of Costa Rica, the Pan-American Highway runs just west of the Cordillera de Guanacaste (Guanacaste Mountains), which includes the active volcanoes of Rincón de la Vieja and Miravalles. While travelling through Costa Rica north of San Jose, the highway route is known as Costa Rica Highway 1 instead of CA Highway 1. From San Jose south to Panama, the highway route is known as Costa Rica Highway 2.

The Tilarán range includes Arenal, one of the world's most active volcanoes. From Barranca, the highway heads east across the mountains and the Continental Divide once again.

After Alajuela the Cordillera Central (Central Mountains) come into view from the Inter-American Highway. The Central Mountains include four large volcanoes--Poás, Barva, Irazú and Turrialba. From Alajuela to San José is about 

San José is the capital and largest city in Costa Rica. Leaving San José, the Inter-American Highway winds its way roughly southeast. From San José to San Isidro de El General is about 

From San Isidro, the Cordillera de Talamanca (Talamanca Mountains) rise up from the rain forest canopy.

Panama 

The highway enters Panama traveling generally from west to east.

This stretch of highway crosses the Santa María river.

From Penonomé, the highway travels southeast, then northeast, then roughly north in a loop as it avoids crossing into Panama's Central Mountains.

Panama City is the capital and largest city in Panama. Before entering the city, the Pan-American Highway crosses over the Panama Canal on the Centennial Bridge, From Panama City, the Highway turns northeast.

At the village of Cañita is the old terminus of the northern route of the Pan-American Highway. The highway continues another  past Cañita to the village of Yaviza. This stretch of highway is extremely remote. Yaviza is a village near the junction of the Tuira and Chucunaque rivers. It is here that officially Pan- American Highway ends. From Yaviza southeast lies the virtually impenetrable Darién Gap, a  stretch of rugged, mountainous jungle terrain.

References

Sources 
Plan Federal Highway System, New York Times, May 15, 1932 page XX7
Reported from the Motor World, New York Times, January 26, 1936 page XX6
Rand McNally Road Atlas, 1998 edition, p. 120, 
Institute for Central American Studies – Costa Rica map
Maps for DXers by Don Moore
Road numbering systems by Marcel Monterie (links page)

North America
Road transportation in North America